Tong Jianming (born June 1963) is a Chinese procurator and politician, currently serving as executive deputy procurator of the Supreme People's Procuratorate.

He is a member of the 20th Central Committee of the Chinese Communist Party.

Biography
Tong was born in Chun'an County, Zhejiang, in June 1963. In 1980, he entered the Renmin University of China, where he majored in law. He joined the Chinese Communist Party (CCP) in November 1985.

After university in 1986, Tong was despatched to the Supreme People's Procuratorate, where he successively worked as assistant director, deputy director, and director of Public Office.

In December 2012, Tong was transferred to north China's Hebei province and was named acting procurator of the Hebei Provincial People's Procuratorate in January 2013, and confirmed in February. He was appointed secretary-general of the CCP Hebei Provincial Committee in July 2017 and was admitted to member of the Standing Committee of the CCP Hebei Provincial Committee, the province's top authority.

In June 2018, Tong was recalled as deputy procurator of the Supreme People's Procuratorate, and was elevated to executive deputy procurator in May 2020.

Book

References

1963 births
Living people
People from Chun'an County
Renmin University of China alumni
People's Republic of China politicians from Zhejiang
Chinese Communist Party politicians from Zhejiang
Members of the 20th Central Committee of the Chinese Communist Party